Anjirak (also Romanized as Anjīrak; also known as Anjīrak-e Soflá) is a village in Ij Rural District, in the Central District of Estahban County, Fars Province, Iran. At the 2006 census, its population was 524 in 123 families.

References 

Populated places in Estahban County